The Robert W. Ferguson House is a historic home in Emathla, Florida. It is located off CR 326, east of the US 27 junction.

On March 23, 1995, it was added to the U.S. National Register of Historic Places.

References

External links
 Marion County listings at National Register of Historic Places

Houses on the National Register of Historic Places in Florida
National Register of Historic Places in Marion County, Florida
Houses in Marion County, Florida
Houses completed in 1886